The Nizamabad – Pune passenger is a long distance daily passenger train that runs between the cities of Nizamabad in Telangana and Pune in Maharashtra state. The train starts from Nizamabad Junction and partially runs on Secunderabad–Manmad line.

Service
The train 51422 starts from Nizamabad railway station at 23:40 IST daily, covering the distance of 774 kilometers in 21 hours and 15 minutes, and halts at all the 75 intermediate stations before reaching Pune at 21:00 IST the next night. On the return journey the train 51421 departs Pune Junction at 14:25 IST and arrives Nizamabad at 10:20 IST the next morning.

Important halts
 Nizamabad
 
 Purna 
 Parbhani
 
 
 Manmad
 
 Daund
 Pune

See also

 Nizamabad–Peddapalli section
 Devagiri Express

References 

Slow and fast passenger trains in India
Rail transport in Telangana
Rail transport in Maharashtra